Kenneth Van Ransbeeck (born 6 December 1994) is a Belgian football player. He plays in Italy for  club Legnago.

Club career
He made his Cypriot First Division debut for Enosis Neon Paralimni on 24 August 2015 in a game against Ayia Napa.

After not playing in the 2018–19 season, on 26 July 2019 he signed with Serie C club Rimini.

On 2 January 2020, he joined Serie D club Taranto.

References

External links
 

1994 births
Living people
Belgian footballers
Association football midfielders
K.V. Woluwe-Zaventem players
Enosis Neon Paralimni FC players
U.S. Catanzaro 1929 players
Rimini F.C. 1912 players
Taranto F.C. 1927 players
F.C. Legnago Salus players
Cypriot First Division players
Cypriot Second Division players
Serie C players
Serie D players
Belgian expatriate footballers
Expatriate footballers in Cyprus
Expatriate footballers in Italy
Belgian expatriate sportspeople in Cyprus
Belgian expatriate sportspeople in Italy